Ofakim ( ʾŎfāqīm, or אוֹפָקִים ʾŌfāqīm, lit. "horizons")  is a city in the Southern District of Israel, 20 kilometers (12.4 mi) west of Beersheba. It achieved municipal status in 1955. It has an area of 10,000 dunams (~3.9 sq mi; 10 km2).

Established as a development town in 1955, Ofakim was for many years a major textile manufacturing center. Outsourcing of textile manufacturing outside Israel caused economic stagnation, and Ofakim suffered high poverty and unemployment rates for many years. Since then, new factories have moved in, and the city is currently undergoing major development.

History

Prior to 1948, the area was known as Khirbat Futais, a Bedouin hamlet populated by members of Al-Qadirat clan of Al-Tiyaha tribe, located along "Wadi Futeis", a seasonal river that drains into wadi Gaza. The hamlet consisted of several mud houses, and the Bedouin residents were engaged in growing wheat, barley, and melon asw well as raising sheep and goats. The hamlet was located along Beersheba-Gaza highway, a strategic location in land of Bedouin tribes whose inter-tribal clashes were a source of worry, prompted Ottomans to build a military fort nearby, the Patish (Futais) fort. By mid-July, during the 1948 War (Operation An-Far), the village fell to the IDF, and the local Bedouin fled to Al-Muharraqa, from which they were expelled to Gaza Strip. The abandoned Bedouin village was destroyed by the IDF in September or October 1948 for reasons that were described as "military".

Ofakim was established in 1955 as an urban center for the rural communities in the area adjacent to the Ottoman fort and on the site of Khirbat Futais. The first inhabitants were immigrants from Morocco and Tunisia. The population in 1955 was about 600. The inhabitants initially lived in huts and tin shacks, but the construction of permanent housing proceeded rapidly, and the construction industry was the main source of income during the early years. In late 1956, after Jewish refugees expelled from Egypt following the Suez Crisis arrived in Israel, 150 Egyptian-Jewish immigrant families, including some Karaite Jews, came to Ofakim. In the following years, 170 Jewish families from Iran arrived, as did additional immigrants from India and Romania. In 1958, Ofakim was granted local council status.

In the late 1950s, the construction industry was still the main employer, and some residents also worked in agriculture nearby, but industry also began to be established in Ofakim, starting with a diamond polishing plant, followed by two textile factories that opened in 1959. At the same time, the town's streets were paved, public parks were established, and schools were founded. In 1961, the population was 4,600.

As in other development towns, the industrial sector historically played an important part in Ofakim's economy. In 1972, 32% of the salaried workers (754 people) were in this sector, and in 1983—924 people (23%). During this period, the textile industry grew to dominate Ofakim's economy. Numerous textile plants were set up, and the industry employed by far the most workers, ranging from 72% (1982–83) to 82% (1972). The Of–Ar (short for Ofakim–Argentina) textile factory was a major employer. In 1983, the population had grown to 12,600.

Ofakim's economy declined after Israeli textile manufacturers began closing their factories in Israel to move their production to other countries with lower labor costs, mainly in Southwest Asia, and to Egypt and Jordan after Israel signed peace treaties with those two countries. Starting in the mid-1980s, the city's textile mills began to shut down, with the last one closing in 1995, rendering much of the population unemployed. In the early 1990s, during the mass migration of Jews from the former Soviet Union to Israel, more than 7,000 Soviet immigrants arrived in Ofakim, and were provided with heavily subsidized housing. This fueled further competition for jobs, and due to the fact that Soviet immigrants were typically better educated than the mainly unskilled or semi-skilled veteran population, they were better able to get the few jobs available. The city also absorbed immigrants from Ethiopia during this time. A few more plants moved into the city in the 1990s, including an electronics factory in 1996, but unemployment remained high. Ofakim gained a reputation as an economically depressed city in Israel.

In 1997, it had the highest unemployment rate in Israel, at 15.3%. It also had the highest unemployment rate in 2004, at slightly over 14%. In 2008, Haaretz reported: "Nearly one-third of the inhabitants are supported by the welfare department and hundreds of families receive aid, including food, from non-profit organizations. Many of the inhabitants in their 50s and 60s have been dreaming of fleeing Ofakim since they were 20. When they retire, they leave."

In the 2007, the Israeli Interior Ministry dismissed Ofakim mayor Avi Asaraf and his entire city council from their posts for failing to implement a recovery plan for Ofakim. Zvika Greengold became the new mayor.

Throughout the 2000s and 2010s, Ofakim gradually saw improvements in its economy. Tax incentives were given to open new factories in Ofakim, and a branch of MATI, an organization that supports small businesses, was opened. The high-tech industry also entered Ofakim. The city is currently undergoing a series of major development projects.

Demographics 

In 2010, about one-fifth of the residents were ultra-Orthodox and one third were immigrants from the former Soviet Union. Most of the rest were members and descendants of the founding generation of the immigrants who arrived in the town in the 1950s and 1960s. In addition, there are small communities of Ethiopian Jews and Palestinians originally from the Gaza Strip who were resettled in Israel after collaborating with Israeli authorities.

According to the Central Bureau of Statistics, Ofakim had a population of 30,662 in 2019, and the population is growing at a rate of 1.4% a year. The percentage of the share of the Arab Palestinian population of Ofakim is very small and about 0.7%.

Economy 

In 2013, about 40% of Ofakim's residents worked in the city. There were about 20 factories in Ofakim on 2,000 dunams of land. Some residents also work in high-tech.

Education 
In 2001, there were 21 schools and 4,704 students in the city – 13 elementary schools (3,079 students), and 8 high schools (1,625 students). 43.3% of 12th grade students were entitled to a matriculation certificate.

Sports
One of Israel's 14 tennis centers is located in Ofakim. It opened in 1990 and has six courts. The city also has a soccer stadium. The Nahal Shomriya cycling route around Ofakim was inaugurated in 2010. The 60-centimeter-wide single route winds through 1,500 dunams (approx 375 acres) in Ofakim Forest, passing through Nahal Shomriya and Nahal Patish, and looping around eight local moshavim.

Transportation 

Ofakim is accessible by Highway 25 and Route 241. Ofakim is connected to the Trans-Israel Highway via Highway 264. 

The Ashkelon–Beersheba railway, a new railway line which connected Ofakim with Tel Aviv and Beersheba, was inaugurated in August 2015, which finally connected the railway line between Ashkelon and Beersheba. The Ofakim railway station was opened on December 31, 2015. The rail line connects Ofakim to Beersheba in the Southeast, and to Ashkelon and beyond to Greater Tel Aviv in the Northwest.

Ben Gurion Airport, the closest major international airport, is located about 101km North from Ofakim, which can be accessed via a drive along the Trans-Israel Highway.

Urban development plans

The city has begun to develop from 2015 onward after years of stagnation. Thousands of new housing units, commercial and employment centers, and a youth center which included a cinema were built. Ofakim Railway Station was completed in December 2015 with a car park for 1,000 cars. Next to the train station, a new neighborhood specially designed to have affordable prices for young people, is being built as part of the "Noah Initiative", which was started by activists from Tel Aviv.

In 2017, a new agreement was signed to build 14,436 housing units in four new neighborhoods and one established neighborhood, which will greatly increase the city's population. In addition, the agreement stipulated the development of an industrial zone in southern Ofakim, increased funding for infrastructure and urban renewal projects, and the construction of a new road between Ofakim and Ramon Airport. The plan aims to double the city's population. High-rise construction of buildings up to 13 stories is also planned.

Notable people

Shimshon Pincus (c. 1944–2001), rabbi
Oren Smadja (born 1970), Olympic judoka
Robert Tiviaev (born 1961), former Knesset member

References

External links
Weaving community: Labour in Ofakim
Works of communal art
 Survey of Western Palestine, Map 24:  IAA,  Wikimedia commons

Cities in Israel
Development towns
Cities in Southern District (Israel)
Populated places established in 1955
1955 establishments in Israel